William Boone Daniels (September 12, 1915 – October 7, 1988) was an American singer active in the United States and Europe from the mid-1930s to 1988, notable for his hit recording of "That Old Black Magic" and his pioneering performances on early 1950s television. He was one of the first African-American entertainers to cross over into the mainstream. Daniels was honored with a star on the Hollywood Walk of Fame in 1977.

Life and career

Early life 
Daniels was born in Jacksonville, Florida, United States. where his father was a postmaster and notary. His mother was a schoolteacher and organist. Daniels had a heritage of Portuguese sailor, Native American (Choctaw), African American, and frontiersman Daniel Boone.

Early career 
In 1935, Daniels moved from Jacksonville to New York to attend Columbia University. He planned to become a lawyer, but he was sidetracked during the Depression. His grandmother was a seamstress in Harlem for the Ziegfeld Follies, and she encouraged her grandson to sing at Dickie Wells, the club where he first worked as a dishwasher, then a singing waiter. There he was discovered by bandleader Erskine Hawkins, who hired him as a featured vocalist. 

Daniels had several accompanists, including Nat Cole, while in New York. In 1948, he teamed with ex-big-band pianist Benny Payne, who had been Cab Calloway's pianist in the Cotton Club. Payne remained as accompanist for the rest of Daniels's career.

"That Old Black Magic"

Daniels' first trademark song from his time on New York radio was the song "Diane," which he recorded on Bluebird in 1941. His later signature song was "That Old Black Magic", by Harold Arlen and Johnny Mercer, which Daniels first recorded for Apollo Records in 1948. His 1950 recording on Mercury became a hit, selling in the millions.

Broadway
Daniels had performed in musicals on Broadway early in his career with a minor role in a short-lived musical, Memphis Bound (1945). More notable was the long run (700+ performances) of Golden Boy with Sammy Davis Jr. in 1964, directed by Arthur Penn. Daniels toured the US in 1975 with Pearl Bailey in the all-black Hello, Dolly!, and in London's West End, he headlined a 1978 presentation of Bubbling Brown Sugar. He was popular in Australia where he first toured with the Andrews Sisters in 1954.

Films and television
Daniels was a pioneer in television with  his own television series that debuted on ABC on October 12, 1952. The Billy Daniels Show was sponsored by Rybutol, a popular vitamin tablet at the time. This 15-minute show, telecast from WJZ-TV in New York on Sunday evenings from what was later to become The Ed Sullivan Theater (and now The Late Show) was a milestone: the first sponsored network television series starring a black performer. He appeared on television in the US and UK and Australia and Canada throughout the 1950s and 1960s with performances on The Milton Berle Show and 'The Ed Sullivan Show.

His films include When You're Smiling (Columbia, 1950) On the Sunny Side of the Street (Columbia 1951) and Columbia's Rainbow 'Round My Shoulder (Columbia, 1952).

In the original script for the movie Goodfellas (working title: "Wiseguys") the narration of the character Karen Hill was to include, "One night, Billy Daniels sent us champagne. There was nothing like it." However, in the final version of the movie, the name was changed to Bobby Vinton.

Later recording career 
Daniels' recordings cover the period of transition from 78-rpm to the dawn of microgroove recording. Remembered mostly for his charismatic live performances, he made an album at Abbey Road, The Magic of Billy Daniels (1978), which contained a disco version of "That Old Black Magic." He recorded one of the first soul records, "Woe Woe Woe", a now rare recording.

Personal life

Marriage and children 
Daniels was married four times: Gladys Gordan (divorced 1940); Florence Clotworthy (died 1947); Martha Braun (divorced 1953); and Pierrette (from 1955 to his death in 1988). 

Daniels and Gladys Gordan had one child; Yvonne Daniels. He had three children with his second wife Florence Clotworthy; Diane, Billy Jr, Bruce. Clotworthy died in 1947. In 1950, Daniels married socialite Martha Braun. Braun filed for divorce in Juarez, Mexico, citing mental cruelty. He did not contest the action. After the divorce Daniels married Pierette Cameron, whom he hired as governess for his children. Pierrette had two daughters with Daniels; Andrea and Dominique. 

Pierrette H. Daniels, Daniels' widow (deceased 2011), and their daughter Dominique Daniels founded a 501(c)(3) non-profit organization, the Billy Daniels Foundation, raising money for underserved youths seeking Arts Education support in her late husband's name. Dominique Daniels, is Chief Executive Officer of the Billy Daniels Foundation.

Health 
Daniels had heart-bypass surgery twice, first in 1982 and then five years later in 1987.

Death 
Daniels died on October 7, 1988, from stomach cancer at the age of 73 in Los Angeles, California. He is buried at the El Camino Memorial Park in Sorrento Valley, San Diego, California.

Discography
 1952 You Go to My Head (Mercury)
 1954 Love Me or Leave Me (Mercury MG-20047)
 1957 You Go to My Head (Verve)
 1958 The Masculine Touch (Verve)
 1960 Touch of Your Lips (Pickwick)
 1963 Love Songs For A Fool (Wing)
 1970 New Black Magic (King)
 1978 The Magic Of Billy Daniels (Music For Pleasure)
 1993 Billy Daniels at the Crescendo (GNP)
 2001 Mr. Black Magic  (GNP/Crescendo)
 2003 Around Midnight (Sepia Records)
 2004 The Legendary Billy Daniels (Sepia Records)

Filmography
 1948 Sepia Cinderella
 1950 When You're Smiling
 1951 Rainbow 'Round My Shoulder
 1952 Sunny Side of the Street
 1959 Night of the Quarter Moon
 1959 The Beat Generation
 1959 The Big Operator
 2009 That Old Black Magic (Arkadia Jazz DVD)

References

Further reading
 The Street That Never Slept by Arnold Shaw. Coward, McCann & Geoghan, 1971. Chapter 14 is about Daniels, plus other references appear throughout.

External links

 Billy Daniels Foundation
 
 

1915 births
1988 deaths
African-American male actors
Columbia University alumni
American male film actors
American male stage actors
American male television actors
Jubilee Records artists
Liberty Records artists
Mercury Records artists
Musicians from Jacksonville, Florida
Apollo Records artists
20th-century American male actors
20th-century African-American male singers